The Styraconyxidae are a family of tardigrades. The family was first described by Reinhardt Møbjerg Kristensen and Jeanne Renaud-Mornant in 1983.

Genera
The family includes the following genera:
 Angursa Pollock, 1979
 Bathyechiniscus Steiner, 1926
 Lepoarctus Kristensen & Renaud-Mornant, 1983
 Paratanarctus D'Addabbo Gallo, Grimaldi de Zio, Morone De Lucia & Troccoli, 1992
 Pleocola Cantacuzène, 1951
 Raiarctus Renaud-Mornant, 1981
 Rhomboarctus Renaud-Mornant, 1984
 Styraconyx Thulin, 1942
 Tetrakentron Cuénot, 1892
 Tholoarctus Kristensen & Renaud-Mornant, 1983

References

Further reading
Kristensens & Renaud-Mornant, 1983 : Existence d'arthrotardigrades semi-benthiques de genres nouveaux de la sous-famille des Styraconyxinae subfam. nov. Cahiers de Biologie Marine (Marine Biologoical Books), vol. 24, no. 3, p. 337-353. 

 
Tardigrade families